Lost+Brain is a Japanese manga series written by Tsuzuku Yabuno and illustrated by Akira Ōtani. It was serialized in Shogakukan's Weekly Shōnen Sunday from December 2007 to July 2008, with its chapters collected in three tankōbon volumes.

Plot
Ren Hiyama, a genius student was tired of the boring world. While he was thinking of recreating the world, he realizes that with hypnosis, he may be able to do that. After a year of testing with his classmates, recreation of the world begins.

Characters

A bored student that sees the people of the world practically living off the scraps in the bottom of the barrel, seeing theirs and his own life meaningless. Therefore he wished to find a way to change the world but didn't know how. That was until he watched a demonstration of the power hypnotism has and spent the past year refining his skills in hypnotism, joining many clubs to use them as guinea pigs for his experimentation, and to the world look like he has changed for the better. Now with all of his preparations he sees that now is the time to activate his plan to rule the world with the people under his command.

He is a student at the same school as Ren and has the second highest grades right below Ren. Like Ren, he too sees the world around him rotting and respected Ren back when he was a first year student, however after watching him adapting to a student lifestyle and becoming friends with the people he views as garbage he lost all respect he had for Ren. However, he is later recruited by Ren where he reveals that he was only acting like that to use the students as his guinea pigs for his hypnotism experiments, describing its potential by stating from records of research that hypnotism can be more destructive than an Atomic Bomb. Skeptical at first, Ren then demonstrations this ability to Shitara, convincing him. Ren recruited Shitara because he saw the same urge to change the world as he himself did and also realizes for his plan to follow through he needs people he can trust to work with him. Although Shitara is highly intelligent, he appears to be easily frightened and very skeptical about some of Ren's plans; but that is easily changed with Ren's determination for his plan to succeed. After figuring out Ren's true plan with his hypnosis, to use it to relieve humanity of their weaknesses, he becomes fully committed to Ren and is willing to gamble his life for Ren.

She becomes the second member of Ren's team. She used to be a girl who was constantly harassed and bullied by her classmates since she was in middle school. Telling Shitara that she wanted to die if to continue living her life like that, he uses the hypnotizing skills Ren taught him to relieve her of her stress, then later was hypnotized by Ren that lead to her burst of self-confidence. She later returns after overhearing Shitara and Ren talking, showing up with a new hair cut and contacts instead of glasses, and dedicating herself to their plan to relieve humanity of their weaknesses through hypnosis. In an early chapter she can be seen in a silhouette with her hair before when Ren speaks of a team to help him.

Uncle to Yuka Takagi and world class hypnotist. He was the one to demonstrate the capabilities that hypnotism can bring by making the weak and meager Oosawa stand up and act like a rock and roll star. Wishing to use this to liberate people of the world from the hypnotism that is being constantly used in media and such. After Oosawa's bombing, he comes onto the case and believes that there was someone manipulating him through the use of hypnotism, referring to this culprit as the "Third Party". He displays utter disgust at the use of hypnotism being used to control people to do horrific acts and is determined to find out who the Third Party is, wanting to use his hypnotism to interview the students and see who was the one controlling them. Ren, seeing him as a threat as his powers can go much deeper than a regular hypnotist and discover who he is in spite of using hypnotism amnesia on his test subjects, Ren concocts a plan to make him disappear by first having him accused of being the Third Party. Then after getting the information of Itsuki's patients from Yuka, Ren hypnotizes them where once Itsuki calls them they will commit suicide, making it appear to the police that he was killing them off to cover his tracks. He is currently captured by the police and it has been broadcast he is a witness in the killings. He is no longer running the taskforce with more and more evidence pointing to him as the Third Party.

 A female student and Vice President to the Student Council with Ren being the President. The main reason she became Vice President was so that she could be close to Ren and finally gains up the courage to tell him how she feels about him. However, these feelings are met with harsh words leaving her heart broken. Yet later on tells him that she still has feelings for him and hopes that he won't leave the Student Council, even introducing her uncle who is a Hypnotism Expert for the school festival. After the time skip she still has feelings for Ren and is completely unaware of his intentions, even allowing him to hypnotize her. However it appears Ren doesn't care for her, as he set it to where she would die if Itsuki digs too deep into her mind.

Hypnotism victims
The following is the list of victims who were controlled by Ren Hiyama.

Ren's first test subject to his hypnotism experiments. He used to be a weak and megar student who was easily bullied by the other students, even to falsely accuse Ren of beating him up and taking his money. Afterwards he apologized to Ren who didn't accept it as he saw it as meaningless. After Ren's hypnotism he becomes more of an open and energetic guy who is a member of the Music Club and the Journalism Club. However, Ren then used this to have him get close to Saeki for a story where he detonated a bomb he was holding, killing them both.

One of Ren's guinea pigs and head of the Journalism Club. Ren has him commit suicide by falling off the building, while holding a suicide note stating that it was Itsuki behind Oosawa's suicide bombing. This being part of the plan to get Itsuki erased and off his trail.

One of Ren's guinea pigs and Head of the Rock Club. Ren has him commit suicide by falling off the building to convince the police that the one after him (Itsuki) is the man behind the attack.

A patient of Itsuki Kuonji. Forced to commit suicide along with 10 other people to raise suspicion about Itsuki.

A new teacher at Ren's school that was bored of her life and felt overworked in her job. She has a noticeable crush on Ren because of his mysterious persona, though Ren takes advantage of this to hypnotize her. She starts to become scared at the sudden gaps in time in her memory even though all of her work gets finished. Ren uses her to offer the idea of a free exchange of student ideas without any teachers as part of his plan. After she has done her part, he releases her of his hypnotism and replaces those gaps of memory, but not before stating his disdain for people like her, who have the power to change though do nothing with it.
Entire Student Body
Through the use of setting up a Free Exchange of Ideas cover through manipulating Onoda, Ren managed to hypnotize every student in the school. He gave them the ability of time manipulation to help with their studying for the upcoming exam, where it felt as if they studied for hours where it had only been minutes. However he set up in reverse as well, but it has yet been described what he has done with this. He later had it set up to where the students who were there during Itsuki presentation have disappeared, further implicating Itsuki as the Third Party.

A politician that Ren has killed during the suicide bomb attack by Oosawa to signal the start of his plan to change the world.

Publication
Lost+Brain is written Tsuzuku Yabuno and illustrated by Akira Ōtani. It was serialized in Shogakukan's Weekly Shōnen Sunday from December 12, 2007, to July 2, 2008. Shogakukan collected its 27 individual chapters into three tankōbon volumes, published from May 16 to August 11, 2008.

Volume list

Criticism
When this manga was first serialized, it was criticized by many readers as the series was similar to another manga, Death Note. This may have been due to the fact that the main character was bored of the world, and he wanted to change it, and age are both similar to Death Note's Light Yagami. As the story progressed however, it became more to do with the main character utilizing hypnosis to change people for the better.

Notes

References

External links
Lost+Brain at Web Sunday 
Mangaka Backstage Akira Ootani 

2007 manga
Psychological thriller anime and manga
Shogakukan manga
Shōnen manga